BioNumbers is a free-access database of quantitative data in biology designed to provide the scientific community with access to the large amount of data now generated in the biological literature. This aims to make quantitative values more easily available, to aid fields such as systems biology.

The BioNumbers project performs literature-based curation of various sources. It is a regularly updated online resource that contains >13,000 entries from ~1,000 distinct references. Examples of data include transcription and translation rates, organism and organelle sizes, metabolites concentrations and growth rates. Entries are provided with full reference and details such as measurement method and comments.  BioNumbers also publishes a monthly review of a problem in quantitative biology.

History

The database is a Wikipedia-format community collaborative initiative began in 2007 by Ron Milo, Paul Jorgensen and Mike Springer at the systems biology department at Harvard Medical School. It is currently managed and curated at the Milo lab from the Weizmann Institute of Science. BioNumbers was being supported by the Systems biology department in Harvard and by the Weizmann Institute.

References

 .

External links
BioNumbers
BioNumbers on OpenWetWare
Barry Schwartz BioNumbers – Specialty Biology Answer Search Engine March 24, 2009

Biological databases